Csaroda is a village in Szabolcs-Szatmár-Bereg county, in the Northern Great Plain region of eastern Hungary.

Geography

Setting
Csaroda is in Szabolcs-Szatmár-Bereg county, on the Beregi-plane, near to Nyíregyháza (73 km) and to Vásárosnamény (12 km).

History
Csaroda and its vicinity was mentioned first in written form in 1299 (sacerdos de Charnawoda). Its name came from the river name Čierna (Čarná) voda - in Slavic languages "Black water"  where it is setting (1270 fluv. Chernauoda). In the 13th century the Káta family was the landowner of the village. In the 14th century the Csaroda family was the landowner, a leading family of Bereg county. In 1446 Vetési family, from 1461 to 1476 the Tegzes, Drágfy, Daróczy and Újhelyi families are the landowners, later the Lónyai, Rédey and Bay family, finally the Teleky counts.

Jews lived in Csaroda for many years until they were murdered in The Holocaust

Sightseeings

Csaroda has its beautiful little 13th-century Romanesque village church with 14th-century Gothic frescos, 17th-century paintings and wood-carvings. An old wooden bell-tower stands by the church (13th century)

References

Bibliography
 Dercsényi D. (1972): Románkori építészet Magyarországon. Corvina, Budapest
 Gerevich T. (1938): Magyarország románkori emlékei. (Die romanische Denkmäler Ungarns.) Egyetemi nyomda. Budapest 
 Gerő, L. (1984): Magyar műemléki ABC. (Hungarian Architectural Heritage ABC.) Budapest
 Henszlmann, I. (1876): Magyarország ó-keresztyén, román és átmeneti stylü mű-emlékeinek rövid ismertetése, (Old-Christian, Romanesque and Transitional Style Architecture in Hungary). Királyi Magyar Egyetemi Nyomda, Budapest

External links

 Csaroda a Vendégvárón
 Légifotók Csarodáról

Csaroda
Csaroda
Jewish communities destroyed in the Holocaust